Kim Yong-su (born 21 December 1979) is a retired North Korean association football midfielder. Between 2002 and 2007 he played 22 international matches and scored four goals, including two goals in the 2006 FIFA World Cup qualification (AFC). He took part in the 2002 Asian Games.

References

1979 births
Living people
Association football midfielders
North Korea international footballers
North Korean footballers
April 25 Sports Club players
North Korean football managers
Footballers at the 2002 Asian Games
Asian Games competitors for North Korea